On 2 July 2011, a Swiss couple was kidnapped in the Balochistan province of southwestern Pakistan. The couple were said to be tourists who were travelling by car to neighboring Iran when they were seized by unidentified gunmen in the Loralai District, which is some 150 km north of the provincial capital Quetta. It was the first time that Swiss nationals had been involved in such an incident in Pakistan, according to the Swiss foreign ministry. Later, the Pakistani Taliban claimed responsibility for the kidnapping.

Pakistani officials notified Swiss diplomats stationed in the country about the abduction as soon as the incident occurred. The Balochistan Police launched a search operation for the couple under the direction of the Government of Balochistan.

In March 2012, the couple escaped after having been held in captivity by the Taliban for over eight months.

See also
Foreign hostages in Pakistan
List of kidnappings
List of solved missing person cases

References

2010s missing person cases
2011 crimes in Pakistan
2011 in Switzerland
Couples
Crime in Balochistan, Pakistan
Foreign hostages in Pakistan
Formerly missing people
History of Balochistan, Pakistan (1947–present)
Kidnappings in Pakistan
Kidnapped Swiss people
Missing person cases in Pakistan
Pakistan–Switzerland relations
Prisoners of the Tehrik-i-Taliban Pakistan